David Pajo (born June 25, 1968) is an American alternative rock musician. He has played a wide variety of music, loosely fitting into several other genres such as hardcore punk, math rock, post-rock, electronica, folk rock and indie pop. Though a multi-instrumentalist (including guitar, bass guitar, banjo and drums), he is best known for his guitar work, most notably with Slint. He is currently a member of Gang of Four.

Career
A native of Louisville, Kentucky, Pajo played with three Louisville hardcore and hardcore-inflected bands in his early career. The first band in which he played was called Obscene Routine, after which he performed as guitarist in Maurice, but it was with Solution Unknown that he made his first recording. He rose to prominence, however, for his work with the influential post-rock band Slint. Since the breakup of Slint, Pajo has seldom held positions in other bands for very long, moving from one to the other quite often. As a result, he has contributed to many line-ups, playing and recording with Will Oldham, The For Carnation, Tortoise, Stereolab, Royal Trux, King Kong, Bush League, Zwan, Peggy Honeywell, Yeah Yeah Yeahs, and Interpol.

He has also performed and released music as a solo artist using various monikers, as Aerial M, M, and most notably, Papa M. Among his 7" and splits with various bands, he has released (as Aerial M) 1997's Aerial M, and (as Papa M) 1999's Live from a Shark Cage, 2001's Whatever, Mortal, and 2003's Hole of Burning Alms.

In February and March 2005, he joined his old bandmates from Slint, Britt Walford, Brian McMahan and Todd Brashear for a reunion tour, and in April released his first solo album not bearing a pseudonym, simply entitled Pajo. The follow-up to Pajo, entitled 1968, was released in August 2006.

Around the middle of 2005, he helped to form the band Dead Child, with Todd Cook (from Shipping News, Retsin, The For Carnation, and Aerial M—and who also played guitar on the 2005 Slint reunion tour), Michael McMahan (from The For Carnation, Starkiller, and Phantom Family Halo—and who also joined Slint on the reunion tour), and Tony Bailey (from Anomoanon, The Party Girls, Verktum, Lords, and Aerial M).

In 2009, Pajo joined the Yeah Yeah Yeahs on the tour for their third album, It's Blitz!

He was confirmed to perform as Papa M at the ATP New York 2010 music festival in Monticello, New York in September 2010.
In June 2010 it was announced that he would be joining the band Interpol as a tour member. He left the tour early on February 27, 2011.

On February 12, 2015, Pajo attempted suicide after posting a lengthy suicide note on his personal blog. He survived this attempt after EMS members were able to rescue him.

On May 1, 2020, it was revealed that David Pajo was a member of a recording project/band called  Household Gods that also consisted of Vern Rumsey of Unwound, Conan Neutron of Conan Neutron & the Secret Friends and Replicator and Lauren K. Newman (LKN) of Palo Verde and LKN Band.

On March 25, 2021, Pajo participated in a group article for the 30th anniversary of Spiderland for Rolling Stone.

On October 18, 2021, it was revealed that Pajo would be playing as a member of the Gang of Four on a 2022 North American Tour.

Discography

As a part of a band
With Solution Unknown
 Taken for Granted EP (1986)
 Karen LP (1987)
 Louisville Sluggers Compilation EP (1988)
 Atskoo (1996)
With Bush League
 Fetor EP
 Sicko EP
 Discography (1994)
With Slint
 Tweez (1989)
 Spiderland (1991)
 Slint (EP) (1994)
With King Kong
 Movie Star EP (1990)
 Old Man on the Bridge (1991)
With The For Carnation
 Fight Songs (April 6, 1995)
With Will Oldham
 Joya (1997)
 I See a Darkness (1999)
 Ease Down the Road (2001)
With Tortoise
 Millions Now Living Will Never Die (January 30, 1996)
 TNT (March 10, 1998)
With Royal Trux
 3-Song EP (1998)
With Zwan
 Mary Star of the Sea (January 28, 2003)
With Peggy Honeywell
 Honey for Dinner (May 20, 2003)
With  Household Gods
 Palace Intrigue (June 5th, 2020)

As a solo artist
M is the Thirteenth Letter
 Safeless / Napoleon (1995)
 Vol De Nuit / Witchazel (1996)
Aerial M
 Aerial M (August 25, 1997)
 M Is (1997)
 Vivea (1998)
 October (1998)
 Post Global Music (January 26, 1999)
Papa M
 Travels in Constants Vol. 5 (1999)
 1999 Tour Single (1999)
 Live from a Shark Cage (October 25, 1999)
 Papa M Sings (2001)
 Whatever, Mortal (2001)
 Songs of Mac (2002)
 Three Songs (2002)
 One (2003)
 Two (2003)
 Three (2003)
 Four (2003)
 Five (2004)
 Six (2004)
 Hole of Burning Alms (February 24, 2004)
 Highway Songs (2016)
 A Broke Moon Rises (2018)
Pajo
 Pajo (June 28, 2005)
 1968 (August 22, 2006)
 Scream with Me (February 24, 2009)
Evila
 Hexes (December 2009)

References

External links
 
 David's blog
 Deathrockstar's interview
 Drag City
 Black Tent Press
 

American musicians of Filipino descent
Living people
Drag City (record label) artists
1968 births
Zwan members
American alternative rock musicians
American rock guitarists
American male bass guitarists
American rock bass guitarists
Math rock musicians
Post-hardcore musicians
Post-rock musicians
Musicians from Louisville, Kentucky
Rock musicians from Kentucky
Slint members
Guitarists from Kentucky
Guitarists from Texas
20th-century American bass guitarists
Tortoise (band) members
The For Carnation members
20th-century American male musicians
King Kong (American band) members
Western Vinyl artists